Eodermaptera is an extinct suborder of earwigs known from the Middle Jurassic to Mid Cretaceous. Defining characteristics include "tarsi three-segmented, tegmina retain venation, 8th and 9th abdominal tergite in females are narrowed, but separate from 10th tergite and not covered by 7th tergite and exposed ovipositor" They are considered to be more closely related to Neodermaptera than the more basal Archidermaptera.

Systematics 

 Family Bellodermatidae Zhao, Shih & Ren, 2010
 †Belloderma Zhao, Shih & Ren, 2010 Daohugou, China, Middle Jurassic (Callovian)
 †Archaeosoma Zhang 1994 Laiyang Formation, China, Early Cretaceous (Aptian)
 Superfamily Semenovioloidea Vishnyakova 1980
 Family Turanodermatidae Engel 2003
 †Turanoderma Vishnyakova 1980 Karabastau Formation, Kazakhstan, Middle-Late Jurassic (Callovian/Oxfordian)
 Family Semenoviolidae Vishnyakova 1980
 †Semenovioloides Vishnyakova 1980 Karabastau Formation, Kazakhstan, Callovian/Oxfordian
†Aglyptoderma Xiong et al, 2021 Jiulongshan Formation, China, Callovian

References 

Earwigs
Insect suborders
Prehistoric insect taxa